The Intercollegiate Football Association (IFA), also known as the American Intercollegiate Football Association, was one of the earliest college football rules-making and scheduling organizations in existence; it was active from the 1873 to 1893 seasons. The IFA teams, Columbia, Harvard, Princeton, and Yale, are now members of the Ivy League.

From soccer to rugby 
The 1869 game between Princeton and Rutgers, which has been called the first intercollegiate football game in America, was a version of association football, known in North America as 'soccer'. The rules were based on London's The Football Association and the round ball could not be advanced by carrying or throwing it. The first IFA was founded in 1873 by Princeton, Yale, and Rutgers to adopt common rules to replace the practice of playing under the home team's rules. Harvard refused to attend the founding meeting, preferring to keep the Boston game, a cross between association and rugby football.

Massasoit House conventions 

On November 23, 1876, representatives from Harvard, Yale, Princeton, and Columbia met at the Massasoit House hotel in Springfield, Massachusetts to standardize a new code of rules based on the rugby game first introduced to Harvard by McGill University in 1874. The rules were based largely on the Rugby Football Union's code from England, though one important difference was the replacement of a kicked goal with a touchdown as the primary means of scoring (a change that would later occur in rugby itself, favoring the try as the main scoring event). Three of the schools—Harvard, Columbia, and Princeton—formed the second Intercollegiate Football Association as a result of the meeting. Yale did not join the group until 1879, because of an early disagreement about the number of players per team. This was the first comprehensive effort to organize and standardize American football. This IFA lasted from the 1877 season until 1893.

Walter Camp, the "father of American football", was instrumental in creating the rules of American football. Camp became a fixture at the annual Massasoit House conventions where rules were debated and changed. He proposed a rule change at the first meeting he attended in 1878: a reduction from fifteen players to eleven. The motion was rejected at that time but passed in 1880. The effect was to open up the game and emphasize speed over strength. Camp's most famous change, the establishment of the line of scrimmage and the snap from center to quarterback, was also passed in 1880. At the 1882 rules meeting, Camp proposed that a team be required to advance the ball a minimum of five yards within three downs.

See also
 Early history of American football
 Ivy League – NCAA Division I FCS conference home to the IFA's members

References

External links
 Rules Adopted By The America Intercollegiate Football Association For 1893 at Chestofbooks.com

 
1873 establishments in the United States
1893 disestablishments in the United States
Sports organizations established in 1873
College sports governing bodies in the United States